Thomas Caers (born 14 January 1973) is a former Belgian footballer and currently manager. He was the manager of Sint-Truidense VV from February 2006 to November 2006, when he resigned.

Caers played for MVV in the Dutch Eerste Divisie and K.A.A. Gent and K. Sint-Truidense V.V. in the Belgian First Division.

Career as a player

1977–1990 KFC Tongerlo
1990–1997 KVC Westerlo
1997–1999 KAA Gent
1999-02/2002 MVV
02/2002-10/2004 Sint-Truidense VV

Career as a manager

02/2006-11/2006 Sint-Truidense VV

References

1973 births
Living people
Belgian footballers
Belgian football managers

Association footballers not categorized by position